Nale may refer to:

 Abia Nale (born 1986), South African footballer
 Nale Boniface (born 1993), Tanzanian beauty pageant winner
 Nale language, also known as Atchin, a dialect of Uripiv spoken in Vanuatu
 Nale, a character in the webcomic The Order of the Stick

See also 
 Nail (disambiguation)